5th Prince was an electoral district in the Canadian province of Prince Edward Island, which elected two members to the Legislative Assembly of Prince Edward Island from 1873 to 1993.

The district comprised the town (city after 1995) of Summerside. It was abolished in 1996.

MLAs

Dual Member

Assemblyman-Councillor

Prince 5
Politics of Summerside, Prince Edward Island
1873 establishments in Prince Edward Island
1996 disestablishments in Prince Edward Island